Lutheran Church of the Reformation is a historic church complex located at Rochester in Monroe County, New York.  It was built in 1900–1902, and is a Late Romanesque Revival style sandy grey brick church with stone embellishments.  It features two flanking towers of differing sizes on the main facade, round arched windows, corbel tables and stone window tracery.  The larger tower has a steeply pitched pyramidal roof.  Attached to the church by a hyphen is a three-story, less elaborate brick dependency.

It was listed on the National Register of Historic Places in 1992.

Gallery

References

Churches on the National Register of Historic Places in New York (state)
Churches completed in 1902
20th-century Lutheran churches in the United States
Churches in Rochester, New York
National Register of Historic Places in Rochester, New York